Circle the Drain or Circling the Drain may refer to:

Circling the Drain, a 1999 compilation of short stories by Amanda Davis
"Circling the Drain", a song from the 2004 Fucked Up album Epics in Minutes
Circling the Drain, a working title for the television series House
 "Circle the Drain" (Katy Perry song), 2010
 "Circle the Drain" (Soccer Mommy song), 2020
 "Circle the Drain", a song by 36 Crazyfists on the 2002 album Bitterness the Star
 "Circle the Drain", a song by Wage War on the 2021 album Manic

See also 
 Coriolis force